Wrightsville is an unincorporated community in Caroline County, in the U.S. state of Virginia. It is located along US 301/VA 2 south of Bowling Green.

References

Unincorporated communities in Virginia
Unincorporated communities in Caroline County, Virginia